Rosmini College is a state integrated Catholic secondary school for boys, situated in Takapuna, Auckland, New Zealand. The school caters to Years 7-13 (Forms 1-7), and currently has a roll of approximately 1097.

Founded in 1962 by Father Catcheside, the school was named after Antonio Rosmini, founder of the Institute of Charity. The school's motto is Legis Charitas Plenitudo, translated as 'Charity Fulfills the Law', or sometimes translated as 'Love Fulfills the Law'. Tom Gerrard was the school's principal from 1976 until 2014, making him New Zealand's longest serving principal.

Curriculum
The school's curriculum mirrors that of state schools, apart from the addition of religious education classes and associated prayers, retreats, and masses. These religious activities and the promotion of Christian values constitute the school's Catholic character. The school's enrolment policy favours boys from Catholic primary schools, although students of other denominations fill the remaining space on the roll, in accordance with government funding legislation for integrated schools.

Facilities

The school's buildings include the Tindall Auditorium and school chapel, a purpose-built music block, the Maire Technology Block, the Sormany Science Centre, main block (containing classrooms, computer labs, administration facilities, staff offices, and the school library), and several prefabs. The school also has two gymnasiums as well as extensive sports fields and courts.

A new gymnasium is the most recent facility. The gym was formally opened in July 2009 by Bishop Pat Dunn, and was named the Tom Gerrard Gymnasium.

Academic
New Zealand's national secondary qualification, the National Certificate of Educational Achievement, is offered to all year 11-13 students. In 2007 the school obtained pass rates of 83%, 86%, and 81% in Years 11, 12, and 13 respectively, figures well above the national average.

Sports
Sport is an integral part of Rosmini life, and the school has enjoyed success at regional level in many sports, particularly rugby. The college's senior basketball team won a New Zealand National Secondary Schools title in 2011, 2017 and 2018. In 1980, the college's senior football team won the National Secondary Schools Football Championship.

Music and performing arts
The college has purpose-built facilities for the teaching of music and performing arts. The school has a small jazz band and choir, in addition to solo performers and rock bands. The school also holds drama productions with sister school Carmel College.

Principals

 Tom Gerrard (1976 - 2014)
 Nixon Cooper (2014 - present)

Notable alumni

Gareth Anscombe - former Chiefs, Auckland, and New Zealand secondary schools rugby representative.
Liam Barry - former All Black
Adrian Blincoe - New Zealand middle distance running representative
Anthony Boric - Professional rugby union player; former All Black
Martin Brill - Olympic fencing representative
Graham Dowd - former All Black
Chris Drum - former Black Cap
David Kosoof - former Black Stick
Blair Larsen - former All Black
Moses Mackay - music, performing arts, and opera star, bass/baritone of trio Sol3 Mio
Mark Mitchell - Member of Parliament for Rodney (2011–present)
Taine Murray - New Zealand basketball player currently with the Virginia Cavaliers
John O'Sullivan - New Zealand rugby league international
Chris Pringle - former Black Cap
Tony Scheirlinck - former All White
Members of the Screaming Meemees (Tony Drumm, Lawrence "Yoh" Landwer-Johan, Peter van der Fluit, Michael O'Neill) 
Martin Snedden - former Black Cap, sports administrator, 2011 Rugby World Cup CEO
Scott Talbot, swimmer and coach
Rudi Wulf - former All Black

Notes

Boys' schools in New Zealand
Educational institutions established in 1961
North Shore, New Zealand
Catholic secondary schools in Auckland
1961 establishments in New Zealand